Tamam Ya Davam is the Iranian version of the television game show Deal or No Deal. It premiered on January 16, 2012 on FARSI1, hosted by Sina Valiollah, the Production Manager for FARSI1.

There are 20 briefcases containing prizes from US$1 to US$20,000.

This show is produced in Dubai, United Arab Emirates.

Scheduling

Case Values
 
<div style="float:left; width:200px;">

References

Deal or No Deal
2012 Iranian television series debuts
2012 Iranian television series endings
2010s Iranian television series
2012 Emirati television series debuts
2012 Emirati television series endings
2010s Emirati television series